Pablo Moses (born Pablo Henry, 28 June 1948, Manchester, Jamaica) is a roots reggae vocalist.

Moses got his start in music performing with informal school bands. He and Don Prendes formed a group and entered talent shows, performing under the name, "The Canaries". Moses released a number of records over several decades, but he is best known for his debut, 1975's Revolutionary Dream, produced by Geoffrey Chung, which included "I Man A Grasshopper", engineered at The Black Ark by Lee "Scratch" Perry.  His 1980 follow up, A Song, was well received by his fans and music critics. Also well received was the single "Ready, Aim, Fire" off his 1983 album "In The Future".

Reviewing the 1978 I Love I Bring LP in Christgau's Record Guide: Rock Albums of the Seventies (1981), Robert Christgau said "a lot of these charming, moralistic reggae ditties have the lyrical and melodic simplicity of Sunday School hymns—'Be Not a Dread' could almost be a roots 'Jesus Loves the Little Children.' And whoever devised the synthesizer riffs that set off Moses's spacey singsong deserves a gold star."

Album discography
Revolutionary Dream (1976, Jigsaw) (also released in 1978 as I Love I Bring)
A Song (1980, Island)
Pave The Way (1981, Island/Mango)
In The Future (1983, Alligator/Mercury)
Tension (1985, Alligator/Mercury)
Live to Love (1988, Rohit)
We Refuse (1990, Profile)
Charlie (1990, Profile)
Confession of a Rastaman (1993, Musidisc)
Mission (1995, RAS)
Reggae Live Sessions (1998, CRS)
The Rebirth (2010)
The Itinuation (2017)

References

External links
 

1948 births
Living people
People from Manchester Parish
Jamaican reggae musicians
Island Records artists